Roshawn Franklin (born June 27, 1982) is an American actor. Franklin is best known for portraying FBI Special Agent Hobbs on the crime drama series FBI.

Life and career 
Franklin was born in Forrest City, Arkansas, on June 27, 1982. His mother Gwendolyn, was 21 years old when she gave birth to Franklin. He eventually moved to Pomona, California. Franklin's acting career began at the age of 14, when he was discovered by a talent agent in Los Angeles.

Franklin's acting career began with small roles on multiple TV series. In 2000, he guest starred on the TV show Opposite Sex. Franklin has appeared in other guest starring television roles over the years including on the shows Grey’s Anatomy, Bones, NCIS, NCIS Los Angeles. He played the recurring role of Officer Ray Terrapin on the soap opera The Haves and the Have Nots.

In 2015, he guest starred in Castle, appearing in the season 7 episode Habeas Corpse. He played Ali Davis in the 2019 romantic comedy What Men Want?.

Since 2019, he's been portraying the role of Special Agent Trevor Hobbs on the drama series FBI.

Filmography

References

External links 

African-American male actors
21st-century American male actors
1982 births
Living people
21st-century African-American people
20th-century African-American people